The 2020 North Texas Mean Green football team represented the University of North Texas during the 2020 NCAA Division I FBS football season. The Mean Green played their home games at Apogee Stadium in Denton, Texas, and competed in the West Division of Conference USA (C–USA).

Previous season
The Mean Green finished the 2019 regular season 4–8, 3–5 in CUSA play which they tied for fourth in the West Division with UTSA and Rice. They were not invited to play in any post season bowl game.

Preseason

Award watch lists 
Listed in the order that they were released

CUSA media days
The CUSA Media Days will be held virtually for the first time in conference history.

Preseason All-CUSA teams
To be released

Schedule
North Texas announced its 2020 football schedule on January 8, 2020. The 2020 schedule consists of 6 home and 6 away games in the regular season.

The Mean Green had a game scheduled against Texas A&M, which was canceled due to the COVID-19 pandemic.

Schedule Source:

Game summaries

Houston Baptist

SMU

Southern Miss

Charlotte

at Middle Tennessee

Rice

at UTSA

Louisiana Tech

at UTEP

vs. Appalachian State (Myrtle Beach Bowl)

Rankings

Players drafted into the NFL

References

North Texas
North Texas Mean Green football seasons
North Texas Mean Green football